Pouteria gigantea is a species of plant in the family Sapotaceae. It is endemic to Ecuador.

References

gigantea
Endemic flora of Ecuador
Critically endangered flora of South America
Taxonomy articles created by Polbot